Francis Wilson (17 May 1939 – 24 April 2022) was a South African economist.

Biography

He was the son of the anthropologists Godfrey Wilson and Monica Wilson. Wilson attended St. Andrew's College, Grahamstown. He obtained a Bachelor of Science (BSc) in physics from the University of Cape Town and a master’s degree in economics as well as a doctorate, both from the University of Cambridge.

Wilson was a member of the academic teaching staff in the School of Economics at the University of Cape Town. He was the founder and director of the Southern African Labour and Development Research Unit (SALDRU). He was also a visiting professor at the Woodrow Wilson School of Public and International Affairs at Princeton University. In 2001 Wilson chaired the International Social Science Council’s Scientific Committee of the International Comparative Research Program on Poverty.

Wilson was the Pro-Vice Chancellor of UCT in 2012.

Awards and honours

In 2016, Wilson was awarded an honorary doctorate from the University of Cape Town for his more than 30 years teaching at UCT’s School of Economics, where he made seminal contributions to unearthing the exploitation of South Africa’s migrant labourers, particularly in the gold mines.

Works

References

 

1939 births
2022 deaths
Alumni of St. Andrew's College, Grahamstown
Academic staff of the University of Cape Town
20th-century South African economists
Members of the Academy of Science of South Africa
Alumni of the University of Cambridge
University of Cape Town alumni
White South African people
21st-century South African economists
People from Livingstone, Zambia
South African people of British descent